Live at Yoshi's may refer to:

 Live at Yoshi's (Dee Dee Bridgewater album), 1998
 Live at Yoshi's (Joe Pass album), 1992
 Live at Yoshi's (Pat Martino album), 2001
 At Yoshi's, George Coleman album, 1989